Herczegh is a Hungarian surname. Notable people with the surname include:

 Ágnes Herczegh (born 1950), Hungarian discus thrower
 Anita Herczegh, Hungarian first lady
 Géza Herczegh (1928–2010), Hungarian judge

See also
 Herczeg

Hungarian-language surnames